Dis-unification, in computer science and logic, is an algorithmic process of solving inequations between symbolic expressions.

Publications on dis-unification
 
 "Anti-Unification" here refers to inequation-solving, a naming which nowadays has become quite unusual, cf. Anti-unification (computer science). 
 
 
 
 
 Comon shows that the first-order logic theory of equality and sort membership is decidable, that is, each first-order logic formula built from arbitrary function symbols, "=" and "∈", but no other predicates, can effectively be proven or disproven. Using the logical negation (¬), non-equality (≠) can be expressed in formulas, but order relations (<) cannot. As an application, he proves sufficient completeness of term rewriting systems.

See also
 Unification (computer science): solving equations between symbolic expressions
 Constraint logic programming: incorporating solving algorithms for particular classes of inequalities (and other relations) into Prolog
 Constraint programming: solving algorithms for particular classes of inequalities
 Simplex algorithm: solving algorithm for linear inequations
 Inequation: kinds of inequations in mathematics in general, including a brief section on solving
 Equation solving: how to solve equations in mathematics

Logic programming
Theoretical computer science
Unification (computer science)